The  was an infantry division in the Imperial Japanese Army. The 30th Division was formed on 14 May 1943 as a triangular division in Pyongyang. The 30th division was not recruited but rather assembled from the infantry regiments detached from the other units.

Action
The 30th division was initially based on the Mindanao, but with the start of the Battle of Leyte in 17 October 1944, it was sent to reinforce defensive positions in Leyte. Two battalions from the 41st regiment of the 30th division landed on Leyte 20 October 1944 and started fighting from 25 October 1944. Reinforcements (2 battalions) of about 2000 men have arrived also 26 October 1944 into the Albuera, Leyte, unloading safely. 41st infantry regiment of the 30th division was ordered 26 October 1944 from Carigara to Jaro, which was under heavy US attack at the moment. They did not make it in time, as Jaro defenses failed 29 October 1944. By 9 November 1944, the 41st regiment has stalled 3.5 km northwest of Jaro town. Although until 29 October 1944 Japanese has planned to leave only 3 battalions of the 30th division, after heavy losses of the 26th division during landing in Ormoc the future reinforcements were held back. Nonaka battalion of a 30th division was ordered to prepare an emergency beach defences near Ipil, Ormoc, which was considered a rear area at the moment. The US forces landed in Ormoc 7 December 1944, and Nonaka battalion "fought bravely", in one case conducting a counter-landing from junks by a machine gun company and an infantry company. By the nightfall 8 December 1944, the Nonaka battalion forces were pushed from the beaches at all points, suffering heavy casualties in the process.

Remained forces of the 30th division fought in the Battle of Mindanao. Initially stretched over entire East Mindanao north of Davao City area, the 30th division did not actively contested the loss of Zamboanga City 10 March 1945 and subsequent US push eastward, ultimately resulting in the isolation of the 100th division in Davao City on the south flank of the 30th division. The 1st battalion of the 74th infantry regiment belonging to the 30th division has tried to stop the US wedge at the Kabacan road junction 22 April 1945, but failed. Still overstretched, the 30th division has established a roughly south-north line of defense Kabacan - Kibawe- Manolo Fortich - Macajalar Bay. Also, separate unit of approximately 2200 men was placed in Butuan Bay beaches. Because the commander of the 30th division have severely under-estimated handicaps to Japanese mobility due Philippine guerillas and air raids, the US attack to the southern end of the defensive line 27 April 1945 was impossible to counter as isolated Japanese units were overrun one after another in rapid sequence. 3 May 1945 the US forces have reached Kibawe. The Japanese infantry battalion at Maramag was able to hold back US attack 6–12 May 1945 in rearguard action, while the rest of the 30th division was trying to assemble in Macajalar Bay area. This objective was done only partially, as US 108th regiment have landed in Macajalar Bay unopposed 10 May 1945, and proceeded 30 km inland until encountering Japanese rearguard 13 May 1945 (and overrunning it 18 May 1945). Another rearguard action has happened in Malaybalay, where remnants of the 30th field artillery regiment (left behind because deemed too heavy for escape to the mountains) were able to hold back the US forces from 20 May 1945 until night of 21 May 1945.

The 30th division plans was to retreat to the Waloe (in now Agusan Marsh Wildlife Sanctuary), but US troops have reached Waloe first, resulting in Japanese retreating to the west after a skirmish 27 June 1945. The scattered Japanese forces have largely survived in the mountains of the Central Mindanao until surrender of Japan 15 August 1945.

Some detachments (approximately battalion-sized) of the 30th division guarding airfields of Sarangani Bay on the far south of the island were eliminated in July 1945.

See also
 List of Japanese Infantry Divisions
 This article incorporates material from the Japanese Wikipedia page 第30師団 (日本軍), accessed 10 March 2016

Reference and further reading
 Madej, W. Victor. Japanese Armed Forces Order of Battle, 1937-1945 [2 vols]
Allentown, PA: 1981

References

Japanese World War II divisions
Infantry divisions of Japan
Military units and formations established in 1943
Military units and formations disestablished in 1945
1943 establishments in Japan
1945 disestablishments in Japan